Dudley Chase (December 30, 1771February 23, 1846) was a U.S. Senator from Vermont who served from 1813 to 1817 and again from 1825 to 1831. He was born in Cornish, New Hampshire.

Career
After graduating from Dartmouth College in 1791, he studied law under Lot Hall in Westminster, Vermont. In 1793, he was admitted to the Vermont bar.

Chase lived, farmed, and practiced law in Randolph, Vermont. He was Orange County State's Attorney from 1803 to 1812. He was a member of the Vermont House of Representatives from 1805 to 1812, serving as Speaker from 1808 to 1812. He was elected to the state constitutional conventions in 1814 and 1822.

Chase was elected to the U.S. Senate as a Democratic-Republican in 1812 and served from 1813 to 1817, when he resigned.  He was the first ever Chairman of the United States Senate Committee on the Judiciary, serving from 1816 to 1817.

After resigning in 1817, he returned to Vermont, where he was chief justice of the Vermont Supreme Court until 1821. He served as a member of the Vermont House of Representatives from 1823 to 1824.

He returned to national politics in 1825 when he was elected as an Anti-Jacksonian to the U.S. Senate, serving until 1831.

Dudley Chase died in Randolph on February 23, 1846.  He was buried in Randolph Center Cemetery.

Family
Dudley Chase was the son of Dudley & Alice (Corbett) Chase, an uncle of Salmon P. Chase (Treasury Secretary, 1861–1864 and Chief Justice of the United States, 1864–1873) and Dudley Chase Denison (a U.S. Representative from Vermont).  He was the brother of Philander Chase.

Home
Dudley Chase's Randolph Center home still stands and is a private residence.

Attempts to locate portrait
Chase is one of between 40 and 50 U.S. Senators for whom the Senate historian has no portrait, photograph, or other likeness on file. According to Randolph historian and Chase descendant Harriet M. Chase, no portrait of Dudley Chase was ever painted.  Other efforts to locate a likeness of Dudley Chase have also proved unsuccessful.

References

External resources

Dartmouth Alumni Bio from 1867

1771 births
1846 deaths
People from Cornish, New Hampshire
People of colonial New Hampshire
American people of English descent
Democratic-Republican Party United States senators from Vermont
National Republican Party United States senators from Vermont
Speakers of the Vermont House of Representatives
Members of the Vermont House of Representatives
Justices of the Vermont Supreme Court
State's attorneys in Vermont
Vermont lawyers
People from Randolph, Vermont
19th-century American lawyers
Dartmouth College alumni
Burials in Vermont